The Western Australian Bank building in York is the third oldest surviving bank building in Western Australia and, until 27 September 2019, was the oldest still in-use as a bank.

History 
The building was designed by the architect, Talbot Hobbs, in Victorian Academic Classical style. Hobbs designed other banks for the Western Australian Bank. The land on which the building stands was purchased from the estate of William Kett in 1889. 

The bank opened for business on 24 August 1889. James Rose was its first manager. Above the bank office is the manager's residence. At the time of its opening, the bank was next door to Edwards & Co's chemist's shop.

The Western Australian Bank amalgamated with the Bank of New South Wales in 1927. In 1982, it merged with the Commercial Bank of Australia to form the Westpac Banking Corporation.  Westpac closed its branch on 27 September 2019.

The building was placed on the register of the National Estate on 21 March 1978 and was classified by the National Trust on 5 March 1985.

Notes

References

Avon Terrace, York
Heritage places in York, Western Australia
Buildings and structures in York, Western Australia